Reputational damage is the loss to financial capital, social capital and/or market share resulting from damage to a firm's reputation. This is often measured in lost revenue, increased operating, capital or regulatory costs, or destruction of shareholder value. Ethics violations, safety issues, security issues, a lack of sustainability, poor quality, and lack of or unethical innovation can all cause reputational damage if they become known.  

Reputational damage can result from an adverse or potentially criminal event, regardless of whether the company is directly responsible for said event, (as was the case of the Chicago Tylenol murders in 1982). Extreme cases may lead to large financial losses or bankruptcy, as per the case of Arthur Andersen.  

Reputation is recorded as an intangible asset in a company's financial records. Hence, damage to a firm's reputation has financial repercussions. Minor issues can be amplified by external social processes which lead to even more severe impacts on a firm's position.

Examples of reputational damage

Wells Fargo 
Wells Fargo was exposed for opening millions of unauthorized bank accounts in 2016. This was done by the firm's retail bankers, who were encouraged or coerced by some supervisors.

The CEO (John Stumpf) and other executives were dismissed. Regulators subjected the bank to fines and penalties, and customers reduced, suspended, or discontinued activities with the bank. The company suffered from heavy reputational damage and financial losses.

Reputational risk was further worsened in 2019 when new legislation was introduced by the House of Representatives. The new legislation uncovered Wells Fargo's practice of offshoring thousands of American jobs and forcing soon to be unemployed workers to train their foreign replacements.

Toyota 
Toyota recalled 8 million vehicles worldwide and froze the sales of eight models in the U.S. in January 2010 amongst pressure from the public, industry regulators and the media. By company estimates, Toyota lost approximately US$2 billion due to the recalls and subsequent lost sales. Additionally, Toyota was fined US$16 million for failing to report the issues promptly and endangering lives. 

More tangible financial harm became evident in 2014, when Toyota and the U.S. Justice Department agreed on a settlement of US$1.2 billion and a public admission of guilt from Toyota for neglecting the defects. The reputational aftermath of these events were measured by Rasmussen, who found that despite 59% of Americans finding Toyota at least somewhat "favorable", there was a significant portion (29%) who found Toyota "very unfavorable".

Reputational risk management 

Proposed frameworks to manage reputational risk include:

 Systematically tracking evolving stakeholder expectations.
 Identifying stakeholder risk factors as part of a general risk management process.
 Transforming risk management processes to become more proactive rather than reflexive.
 Regularly auditing the catalysts of corporate reputations using the most recent reputation monitoring technologies and services.

See also 
 Audit
 Center for Audit Quality
 Continuous auditing
 COSO framework, Risk management
 Quality audit
 Reputation management

References 

Financial risk
Risk